The State Council — Khase of the Republic of Adygea is the regional parliament of Adygea, a federal subject of Russia. A total of 50 deputies are elected for five-year terms.

History

Its early predecessor was the Supreme Soviet. In 1993, that was succeeded by the Legislative Assembly.

In 1996, the State Council succeeded the Legislative Assembly.

In 2001–06, it was composed of the Council of Representatives and the Council of the Republic, both of which were elected every five years. There were twenty-seven representatives in each.

In 2006 the State Council became unicameral again.

Elections

2021

See also
List of Chairmen of the State Council of the Republic of Adygea

References

Politics of the Republic of Adygea
Adygea, Republic of
Adygea
Adygea